Upton P. Bell (born 1937) is an American former National Football League (NFL) executive, talk show host, and sports commentator. He is the son of former NFL commissioner Bert Bell and Broadway theatre actress Frances Upton.

Football executive

Baltimore Colts
Bell started his football career by working at the Baltimore Colts' training camp, moved to the ticket office, and in 1964 transitioned to the Colts' scouting department where he became personnel director in May 1966. His responsibilities included scouting and negotiating contracts with and signing of all college football recruits. He worked with Weeb Ewbank and Don Shula. During Upton's tenure, the Colts were in two NFL Championship games (1964 and 1968) and two Super Bowl games, losing Super Bowl III in 1969 then winning Super Bowl V in 1971 under new head coach Don McCafferty. Seventeen of the 40-man roster on that winning team were players drafted during Upton's tenure as personnel director. Bell held the personnel director's job until he was hired to become the general manager of the then Boston Patriots.

New England Patriots
Bell joined the Patriots in February 1971, and at age 33, was the NFL's youngest general manager. One of Bell's first moves was recommending to the Patriots' board of directors that they change the team name from the proposed Bay State Patriots to New England Patriots, as the team relocated from Boston to Foxborough, Massachusetts.

Bell later hired Bucko Kilroy and put together the Patriots' first scouting department. For the scouting department Bell hired Tom Boisture, Dick Steinberg, Mike Hickey and Bob Terpening, all of whom went on to head scouting positions in the NFL. Bell also hired as assistant general manager Peter Hadhazy, who later became general manager of the Cleveland Browns.

Under Bell's leadership, the Patriots improved from their 1970 record of 2–12 to 6–8 in 1971. Despite the improvement, Bell wanted to fire head coach John Mazur and hire a coach of his own choosing. The team's board of directors agreed that if the Patriots lost to the Baltimore Colts in the final week of the regular season, Mazur would be fired. The Patriots won, 21–17, helped by an 88-yard touchdown pass from Jim Plunkett to Randy Vataha in the fourth quarter. The Patriots fell to 3–11 the following season, and Bell was fired on December 5, 1972.

Charlotte Hornets
Bell returned to professional football in 1974 with the purchase of the New York Stars in the World Football League (WFL). Bell, who also served as team president and general manager, relocated the team to Charlotte, North Carolina, where the team was renamed the Charlotte Hornets. This venture was short-lived due to the folding of the WFL in 1975. One of Bell's co-owners was Arnold Palmer. After the closure of the WFL, many of Bell's players along with all his coaches were signed into the NFL. They included Lindy Infante, who became the Packers' head coach; Tom Moore of the Indianapolis Colts; and Bob Gibson of the New York Giants. Bell also recommended Charlotte to the NFL as a franchise city.

Sports announcer
Starting in 1976, Bell began a long media career by making guest appearances on programs such as John Sterling’s show on WMCA in New York. In 1977, Bell was the host of the Pats Post Game Show on WBZ. In 1978, he became co-host of WBZ’s Calling All Sports with newcomer Bob Lobel. Other shows hosted by Bell included Sports Nightly (1979–1980), Sports Line on WEEI (1980–1984), Sports Beat on WSBK-TV (1989–1996) with Joe Fitzgerald, Bob Ryan and Bob Lobel, and Upton Commentary with columnist Will McDonough of The Boston Globe on WNEV Channel 7 (1984–1988) and New England Sports Final (1989–2007). He was also a guest commentator on NECN and Sports Final on WBZ-TV. During the 1989 and 1990 NFL seasons, Bell served as an interviewer for WBZ-TV during their Patriots pre-game show and newscasts. 

Bell’s first color commentary experience came at WSMW where he called college football with Bob Fouracre from 1978 to 1982. In 1983, Bell served as the color commentator for the Boston Breakers professional football team on WNEV and ESPN and was the studio host for Sports Channel New England. He was the color commentator for the Boston College Eagles football radio broadcasts with play-by-play announcers Dan Davis in 1985 and Bob Lobel in 1986. Bell was also a fill in-color commentator for Sports Channel New England’s Boston Celtics games as well as host of their nightly talk show.

Nationally, Bell worked on Ivy League football games on PBS alongside play-by-play announcer Dick Galiette and sideline reporter Sean McDonough in 1984. Bell also was co-host of the first national television show on the NFL Draft on PBS in 1977.

Talk radio
Bell transitioned from sports talk on radio to general talk in 1988. He succeeded Dave Maynard on WBZ radio in 1990. After 1988, Bell hosted shows on WHDH (1988–1989), WTAG (1992–1998), WRPT/WMEX (1998–2003). For three consecutive years, the Upton Bell Show was recognized by the Associated Press as Outstanding Talk Show in New England.

Notable people that Bell interviewed include George H. W. Bush, Bill Clinton, Tip O'Neill, Stephen Hawking, Henry Kissinger, Ted Kennedy, Geraldine Ferraro, Norman Mailer, Regis Philbin, Frank McCourt, Jay Leno, Dr. Joyce Brothers, Jackie Mason, Sam Donaldson, Stephen King, Johnnie Cochran and Alan Dershowitz.

In November 2010, Bell and Bob Lobel reunited briefly with a Sunday morning program on WXKS 1200 Radio in suburban Boston.

Works

References

External links
 Upton Bell channel on YouTube
  hosted by Upton Bell with Lou Gorman, Bob Lobel, Bob Ryan, and Joe Fitzgerald

1937 births
Living people
Sportspeople from Philadelphia
National Football League general managers
New England Patriots executives
World Football League executives
Boston sportscasters
Television anchors from Boston
Boston College Eagles football announcers
National Football League announcers
National Basketball Association broadcasters
American sports radio personalities
Players of American football from Philadelphia